Pechey Forestry Arboretum is a heritage-listed forest reserve at Pechey State Forest, New England Highway, Pechey, Toowoomba Region, Queensland, Australia. It was added to the Queensland Heritage Register on 23 July 1999.

History 
In 1910 the then Under Secretary of the Department of Public Lands in which Forestry was a sub-department, wrote that the needs of Queensland pine timber would have to be met by exotic varieties secured by importation in a manufactured state or from local plantations on land incapable of producing indigenous varieties.

Arboreta are plots of land where different varieties of trees and plants are planted by government or research bodies to determine suitability of plantings in particular climate, soil type and topography conditions.

As an example of the scientific research into the viable varieties of exotic plantings the Pechey Forestry Arboretum was established. The initial areas of the Pechey State Forest were purchased from the estate of EW Pechey by the Forestry Department in 1926. Under the guidance of Elton Sharman, establishment of plantation areas was commenced in 1927. The land was to supply miscellaneous hardwood, case timbers and future plantation softwood for the Darling Downs market.

A nursery was established on the site in 1927.

Description 
The  Arboretum is located on the New England Highway south east of Perseverance Dam Road within the Pechey State Forest, Number 909.

The Pechey Forestry Arboretum is a plot of heavily treed land which retains seven of the original twenty-four species planted in the late 1920s. The overall condition of the place is reasonable although infested with weeds.

Heritage listing 
Pechey Forestry Arboretum was listed on the Queensland Heritage Register on 23 July 1999 having satisfied the following criteria.

The place is important in demonstrating the evolution or pattern of Queensland's history.

The Forestry industry has played an important role in the economic, social and historical development of the Queensland. The Pechey Forestry Arboretum demonstrates the phase from the 1920s when plots were planted for scientific and research purposes to develop and encourage diversity within the Forestry industry.

The place has potential to yield information that will contribute to an understanding of Queensland's history.

The Arboretum has the potential to yield further information about the establishment of arboreta, a field of significant research to the agricultural development of Queensland, about which little research has been done.

The place is important in demonstrating the principal characteristics of a particular class of cultural places.

The Arboretum has scientific significance and demonstrates the principle characteristics of scientific plots, in particular, it represents the optimum development of plots which were planted in the 1920s.

References

Attribution

External links 

Queensland Heritage Register
Toowoomba Region
Forests of Queensland
Arboreta in Australia
Parks in Queensland
Articles incorporating text from the Queensland Heritage Register
1928 establishments in Australia